Khujehlar (also Romanized as Khūjehlar; also known as Khājehlar, Khojeh Lar, and Khvājeh Lar) is a village in Kongor Rural District, in the Central District of Kalaleh County, Golestan Province, Iran. At the 2006 census, its population was 857, in 202 families.

References 

Populated places in Kalaleh County